The 1894–95 Drexel Blue and Gold men's basketball team represented Drexel Institute of Art, Science and Industry during the 1894–95 men's basketball season. The Blue and Gold, led by 1st year head coach John Gray, played their home games at Main Building.  The 1894–95 team was the first at Drexel, and the 5th collegiate team to start up in the US.  The first game of the season against Temple University was the first intercollegiate event ever played at the school.

Roster

Schedule

|-
!colspan=9 style="background:#F8B800; color:#002663;"| Regular season
|-

References

Drexel Dragons men's basketball seasons
Drexel
Drexel
Drexel